Batnfjord or Batnfjorden is a fjord in Gjemnes Municipality in Møre og Romsdal county, Norway. Other villages on the shores of the fjord include Gjemnes, Torvikbukt, and Øre. The European route E39 highway runs along the northern shore of the fjord. The Batnfjordelva flows into this fjord.

See also
 List of Norwegian fjords

References

Gjemnes
Fjords of Møre og Romsdal